Emma de Broughe (born 6 September 2000) is a sportswoman from Australia who plays field hockey and cricket.

Personal life
Emma de Broughe was born and raised in Adelaide, South Australia.

De Broughe studied at Sacred Heart College, graduating in 2018.

Hockey

Domestic career
In Hockey Australia's domestic competitions, Emma de Broughe represents her home state, South Australia (SA).

AHL and Hockey One
In 2018, De Broughe made her debut in the Australian Hockey League (AHL) for the SA Suns. Following the overhaul of the AHL, Hockey Australia subsequently introduced of a new domestic league, the Sultana Bran Hockey One League. De Broughe made her debut for SA's new representative team, the Adelaide Fire, in season one of the new league in 2019.

International career
Emma de Broughe first represented Australia at an FIH sanctioned event in 2018, during a qualifier for the 2018 Youth Olympic Games.

Under–21
De Broughe made her debut for the Australia U–21, the Jillaroos, during a 2019 Tri–Nations Tournament in Canberra.

Following her debut in 2019, De Broughe represented the team again in 2020 during a four match test–series against Japan in Canberra.

Cricket

In addition to field hockey, De Broughe also plays competitive cricket.

Career
Emma de Broughe plays for Sturt Cricket Club in SACA's Statewide Super 1st Grade competition.

Domestic competition
In the Women's National Cricket League (WNCL), De Broughe represents the South Australian Scorpions. She was first signed to the team in 2019 following standout performances in state competition and on the national stage.

Media profile
On December 29 2021, Emma became the fourth guest and first dual-athlete to join sports journalism brand Featuring Faulks.

References

External links
 
 
 
 
 Emma de Broughe at Cricket Australia
 Emma de Broughe at the South Australian Cricket Association

2000 births
Living people
Australian female field hockey players
Australian women cricketers
Female field hockey forwards
Cricketers from South Australia
People educated at Sacred Heart College, Adelaide
South Australian Sports Institute alumni
South Australian Scorpions cricketers
21st-century Australian women